The Territory of Colorado was an organized incorporated territory of the United States that existed from February 28, 1861, until August 1, 1876, when it was admitted to the Union as the State of Colorado.

The territory was organized in the wake of the Pike's Peak Gold Rush of 1858–1861, which brought the first large concentration of white settlement to the region. The organic act creating the territory was passed by Congress and signed by President James Buchanan on February 28, 1861, during the secessions by Southern states that precipitated the American Civil War. The boundaries of the Colorado Territory were identical with those of the current State of Colorado. The organization of the territory helped solidify Union control over a mineral-rich area of the Rocky Mountains. Statehood was regarded as fairly imminent, but territorial ambitions for statehood were thwarted at the end of 1865 by a veto by President Andrew Johnson. Statehood for the territory was a recurring issue during the Ulysses Grant administration, with Grant advocating statehood against a less willing Congress during Reconstruction. The Colorado Territory ceased to exist when the State of Colorado was admitted to the Union in 1876.

East of the Continental Divide, the new territory included the western portion of the Kansas Territory, as well as some of the southwestern Nebraska Territory, and a small parcel of the northeastern New Mexico Territory. On the western side of the divide, the territory included much of the eastern Utah Territory, all of which was strongly controlled by the Ute and Shoshoni. The Eastern Plains were held much more loosely by the intermixed Cheyenne and Arapaho, as well as by the Pawnee, Comanche and Kiowa. In 1861, ten days before the establishment of the territory, the Arapaho and Cheyenne agreed with the U.S. to give up most their areas of the plains to white settlement but were allowed to live in their larger traditional areas, so long as they could tolerate homesteaders near their camps. By the end of the American Civil War in 1865, the Native American presence had been largely eliminated from the High Plains.

History

The land which ultimately became the Colorado Territory had first come under the jurisdiction of the United States in three stages: the 1803 Louisiana Purchase as adjusted by the 1819 Adams–Onis Treaty, the 1845 Annexation of Texas, and the 1848 Mexican Cession. The land claims of Texas were, at first, controversial. The border between the U.S. and Mexico was redefined by the Treaty of Guadalupe Hidalgo at the end of the Mexican–American War in 1848, and the final boundaries of the state of Texas were established by the Congressional Compromise of 1850.

Indigenous populations
Originally, the lands that comprised the Colorado Territory were inhabited primarily by the Ute from Western Colorado out onto the eastern high plains, and Anasazi in southwestern, southern, and part of southeastern Colorado. The Comanche and Jicarilla Apache also formally ruled over the southeastern portions of the state. Arapaho and Cheyenne also hunted, warred, and sometimes lived in the eastern and northeastern plains of the state as well.

Exploration by non-native peoples
The earliest explorers of European extraction to visit the area were Spanish explorers such as Coronado, although the Coronado expedition of 1540–42 only skirted the future border of the Colorado Territory to the south and southeast. In 1776, Francisco Atanasio Domínguez and Silvestre Vélez de Escalante explored southern Colorado in the Dominguez-Escalante Expedition.

Other notable explorations included the Pike Expedition of 1806–07 by Zebulon Pike, the journey along the north bank of the Platte River in 1820 by Stephen H. Long to what came to be called Longs Peak, the John C. Frémont expedition in 1845–46, and the Powell Geographic Expedition of 1869 by John Wesley Powell.

Early settlements, trade, and gold mining
In 1779, Governor de Anza of New Mexico fought and defeated the Comanches under Cuerno Verde on the Eastern Slope of Colorado, probably south of Pueblo. In 1786, de Anza made peace with the Comanches, creating an alliance against the Apaches.

A group of Cherokee crossed the South Platte and Cache la Poudre River valleys on their way to California in 1848 during the California Gold Rush. They reported finding trace amounts of gold in the South Platte and its tributaries as they passed along the mountains. In the south, in the San Luis Valley, early Mexican families established themselves in large land grants (later contested by the U.S.) from the Mexican government.

In the early 19th century, the upper South Platte River valley had been infiltrated by fur traders, but had not been the site of permanent settlement. The first movement of permanent U.S. settlers in the area began with the Kansas–Nebraska Act of 1854, which allowed private land claims to be filed. Among the first settlers to establish claims were former fur traders who returned to the lands they once trapped, including Antoine Janis and other trappers from Fort Laramie, who established a town near Laporte along the Cache la Poudre in 1858. See Forts in Colorado.

In 1858, Green Russell and a party of Georgians, having heard the story of the gold in the South Platte from Cherokee after they returned from California, set out to mine the area they described. That summer they founded a mining camp Auraria (named for a gold mining camp in Georgia) at the confluence of the South Platte and Cherry Creek. The Georgians left for their home state the following winter. At Bent's Fort along the Arkansas River, Russell told William Larimer, Jr., a Kansas land speculator, about the placer gold they had found. Larimer, realizing the opportunity to capitalize on it, hurried to Auraria. In November 1858, he laid claim to an area across Cherry Creek from Auraria and named it "Denver City" in honor of James W. Denver, the current governor of the Kansas Territory. Larimer did not intend to mine gold himself; he wanted to promote the new town and sell real estate to eager miners.

Larimer's plan to promote his new town worked almost immediately, and by the following spring the western Kansas Territory along the South Platte was swarming with miners digging in river bottoms in what became known as the Colorado Gold Rush. Early arrivals moved upstream into the mountains quickly, seeking the lode source of the placer gold, and founded mining camps at Black Hawk and Central City. A rival group of civic individuals, including William A.H. Loveland, established the town of Golden at the base of the mountains west of Denver, with the intention of supplying the increasing tide of miners with necessary goods.

Territorial aspirations
The movement to create a territory within the present boundaries of Colorado followed nearly immediately. Citizens of Denver and Golden pushed for territorial status of the newly settled region within a year of the founding of the towns. The movement was promoted by William Byers, publisher of the Rocky Mountain News, and by Larimer, who aspired to be the first territorial governor. In 1859, settlers established the Territory of Jefferson, and held elections, but the United States Congress did not recognize the territory, and it never gained legal status. 

Congressional grant of territorial status for the region was delayed by the slavery issue, and a deadlock between Democrats, who controlled the Senate, and the antislavery Republicans, who gained control of the House of Representatives in 1859. The deadlock was broken only by the Civil War. In early 1861, enough Democratic senators from seceding states resigned from the U.S. Senate to give control of both houses to the Republicans, clearing the way for admission of new territories. Three new territories were created in as many days: Colorado (February 28), Nevada (March 1), and Dakota (March 2). 

Colorado Territory was officially organized by Act of Congress on February 28, 1861, out of lands previously part of the Kansas, Nebraska, Utah, and New Mexico territories. Technically the territory was open to slavery under the Dred Scott Decision of 1857, but the question was rendered moot by the impending American Civil War and the majority pro-Union sentiment in the territory. The name "Colorado" was chosen for the territory. It had been previously suggested in 1850 by Senator Henry S. Foote as a name for a state to have been created out of present-day California south of 35° 45'. To the dismay of Denverites, the town of Colorado City was designated the first territorial capital, quickly succeeded by Golden. Denver eventually became the temporary territorial capital, but was not designated the permanent capital until 1881, five years after Colorado became a state.

Civil War years
During the Civil War, the tide of new miners into the territory slowed to a trickle, and many left for the East to fight. The Missourians who stayed formed two volunteer regiments, as well as home guard. Although seemingly stationed at the periphery of the war theaters, the Colorado regiments found themselves in a crucial position in 1862 after the Confederate invasion of the New Mexico Territory by General Henry Sibley and a force of Texans. Sibley's New Mexico campaign was intended as a prelude to an invasion of the Colorado Territory northward to Fort Laramie, cutting the supply lines between California and the rest of the Union. The Coloradans, under the command of Union Army General Edward Canby and Colonel John P. Slough, Lt. Col. Samuel F. Tappan and Major John M. Chivington, defeated Sibley's force at the two day  Battle of Glorieta Pass along the Santa Fe Trail, thwarting the Confederate strategy.

Colorado War between the U.S. and the Indians of Cheyenne and Arapaho

In 1851, by the Treaty of Fort Laramie, the United States promised the Cheyenne and Arapaho tribes control, in the Colorado area, of the Eastern Plains between North Platte River and Arkansas River eastward from the Rocky Mountains. The Fort Laramie Treaty, in Article 4 of the treaty, did allow U.S. citizens to lawfully reside in or pass through the newly created Indian territories. Since this treaty was enacted before the railroads had come and before the finding of gold in the region, few whites had ventured to settle in what is now Colorado. By the 1860s, as a result of the Colorado Gold Rush and homesteaders encroaching westward into Indian terrain, relations between U.S. and the Native American people deteriorated. On February 18, 1861, in the Treaty of Fort Wise, several chiefs of Cheyenne and Arapaho agreed with U.S. representatives to cede most of the lands, ten years earlier designated to their tribes, for white settlement, keeping only a fragment of the original reserve, located between Arkansas River and Sand Creek. This new fragment was assigned in severalty to the individual members of the respective tribes with each member receiving  of land. The United States, by the Fort Wise Treaty, wished to have the Indians settle the new reservation as farmers. The U.S. agreed to pay the tribes a combined total of $30,000 per year for 15 years and in addition to provide a lumber mill, one or more mechanic shops, dwelling houses for an interpreter, and a miller engineer. See Article 5 of the Fort Wise Treaty.

A good part of their co-nationals repudiated the treaty, declared the chiefs not empowered to sign, or bribed to sign, ignored the agreement, and became even more belligerent over the 'whites' encroaching on their hunting grounds. Tensions mounted when Colorado territorial governor John Evans in 1862 created a home guard of regiments of Colorado Volunteers returning from the Civil War and took a hard line against Indians accused of theft. On August 21, 1864, a band of 30 Indians attacked four members of the Colorado Cavalry as they were rounding up stray cattle. Three of the members made it back to the stockade at Franktown, Colorado, but the fourth man failed to return. This man, Conrad Moschel, was found a few days later having been shot with a firearm and pierced with an arrow, and had been scalped in the manner of the Cheyenne. This offensive action by the warring Cheyenne further enraged the U.S. people of Colorado. After several minor incidents in what would later come to be designated as the Colorado War, in November 1864, a force of 800 troops of the Colorado home guard, after heavy drinking, attacked an encampment of Cheyenne and Arapaho at Sand Creek, murdering between 150 and 200 Indians, mostly elderly men, women and children. This Sand Creek Massacre or 'Massacre of Cheyenne Indians' led to official hearings by the United States Congress Joint Committee on the Conduct of the War in March and April 1865. After the hearings, the Congress Joint Committee in their report on May 4, 1865, described the actions of Colonel John Chivington and his Volunteers as "foul, dastardly, brutal, cowardly" and:

Nevertheless, justice was never served on those responsible for the massacre; and nonetheless, the continuation of this Colorado War led to expulsion of the last Arapaho, Cheyenne, Kiowa and Comanche from the Colorado Territory into Oklahoma.

The movement for statehood
Following the end of the American Civil War, a movement was made for statehood; the United States Congress passed the Admission Act for the territory in late 1865, but it was vetoed by President Andrew Johnson. For the next eleven years, the movement for territorial admission was stalled, with several close calls. President Grant advocated statehood for the territory in 1870, but Congress did not act.

In the meantime, the territory found itself threatened by lack of railroads. By the late 1860s, many in Denver had sold their businesses and moved northward to the Dakota Territory communities of Laramie and Cheyenne, which had sprung up along the transcontinental railroad. Faced with the possible dwindling of the town and its eclipse by the new towns to the north, Denverites pooled their capital and built the Denver Pacific Railroad northward to Cheyenne to bring the rail network to Denver. The Kansas Pacific Railway was completed to Denver two months later. The move cemented the role of Denver as the future regional metropolis. The territory was finally admitted to the Union in 1876.

Territorial capitals

Three of Colorado's earliest communities had the honor of serving as capital of Colorado Territory:

Colorado City (1861–63)
Golden City (1863–69)
Denver City (1869–76)

Governmental buildings

For much if not all of its existence, the Colorado Territorial government did not actually own its houses of government, instead renting available buildings for governmental purposes. Today, two buildings which served the Territorial government remain:  the historic log building in Colorado City, and the Loveland Block in downtown Golden (which had housed the complete legislature, Territorial Library and possibly Supreme Court from 1866–67, with library remaining to 1868). Others which served include the original Loveland Building (1859–1933, 1107 Washington Avenue in Golden, housing the Territorial House from 1862–66); the Overland Hotel (1859–1910, 1117 Washington Avenue in Golden, housing the Territorial Council from 1862–66); and the Territorial Executive Building (unknown dates, approximately 14th and Arapahoe Streets in Golden, housing the executive branch of the government from 1866–67).

See also

Colorado in the American Civil War
Colorado War
Comanche Campaign
History of Colorado
List of territorial claims and designations in Colorado
Pike's Peak Country

References

External links
 Report of the United States Congress Joint Committee on the Conduct of the War, 1865 at University of Michigan Digital Library Production Service, University of Michigan
 

 

History of Colorado
History of the American West

1876 disestablishments in Colorado
States and territories established in 1861
States and territories disestablished in 1876